The Armour-Swift-Burlington (ASB) Bridge, also known as the North Kansas City Bridge and the LRC Bridge, is a rail crossing over the Missouri River in Kansas City, Missouri, that formerly handled automobile traffic.

History

The piers were built in 1890. However, later that year, lack of funding prevented the bridge from being built. In 1909, Waddell & Harrington designed the current bridge and construction started. The bridge is one of two of this type that had car traffic on Route 9 on the upper level, and rail traffic on the lower level. The lower deck could be raised to permit riverboats to pass without interrupting car traffic on top. This design allowed the hangers from the lower deck to go through the truss members of the upper deck. The bridge was built by a combination of Armour Packing Company, Swift & Company, and Chicago, Burlington and Quincy Railroad.

In 1987, the Heart of America Bridge opened to the east to replace the vehicular portion.

In 1996, the remaining part of the ASB was designated by the American Society of Civil Engineers as a National Historic Civil Engineering Landmark. The bridge is now owned by the BNSF Railway. The ASB has a  main span, and makes it the ninth-longest vertical-lift drawbridge in the United States.

Timeline
1890:
Nine stone masonry piers built; engineer John Alexander Low Waddell did not agree with piers, funding ceased and the piers would sit unused until 1909.

1909:
The companies of Armour Packing House, Swift and Company, and Chicago Burlington and Quincy Railroad put in funds to build bridge.
Piers shaved to ten feet above high-water mark, J. A. L. Waddell's firm of Waddell & Harrington created a new design, work begins.

December 28, 1911:
Bridge opened to traffic, two lanes of automobile on upper level, one track of railroad on lower.

1915 to 1926:
On the Jefferson Highway. From Jefferson Highway Association era materials.

January 1913:
Electric interurban cars begin use of streetcar rails on upper deck.

May 2, 1927:
South approach span damaged in fire, replaced later that month.

August 1927:
Bridge taken over by Missouri State Highway Department and tolls removed. Bridge floor replaced.

1932:
Steel girder span over Second Street replaced.

1948:
Bridge deck replaced, repairs and new lights added.
Streetcar rails removed, and opened to four lanes of traffic.

1949:
Collars placed around river piers to prevent rust.

1950:
Bridge cleaned and repainted.

1951:
Bridge survives 1951 flood.

1952:
North approach widened.

1966:
North approach widened and resurfaced.

1967:
Bridge deck repaired.

1981–1982:
Repair of girder lines on downstream side of railroad deck.

1987:
Heart of America Bridge opened to the east, upper auto deck closed to all traffic.

1988–1989:
Upper deck surface removed, and bridge given to Burlington Northern railroad.

1996:
Bridge added as a National Historic Civil Engineering Landmark by the American Society of Civil Engineers, for being one of only two of that type ever built in the United States.

See also
List of bridges documented by the Historic American Engineering Record in Missouri
List of crossings of the Missouri River

References

External links
Armour-Swift-Burlington Bridge on website of American Society of Civil Engineers, Kansas City chapter

Railroad bridges in Missouri
Bridges in Kansas City, Missouri
Bridges completed in 1911
BNSF Railway bridges
Historic American Engineering Record in Missouri
Historic Civil Engineering Landmarks
Vertical lift bridges in Missouri
Former toll bridges in Missouri
1911 establishments in the United States
Metal bridges in the United States